Urban Chaos: Riot Response is a first-person shooter video game developed by British games developer Rocksteady Studios and published by Eidos Interactive for the PlayStation 2 and Xbox. The game was released in May 2006 in Europe and June 2006 in North America. It is Rocksteady Studios' debut game, and is so far the only game developed by Rocksteady not based on a DC Comics property.

The player controls Nick Mason, a member of the newly formed "T-Zero" riot control squad, in an unnamed modern American city that has been overtaken by the notorious Burners gang. The gang members, armed with cleavers, molotov bombs and firearms are attacking civilians, paramedics, firefighters and police officers, and it is up to him to stop them. He must defeat them by whatever means necessary in order to protect the city, capturing gang leaders and rescuing injured civilians along the way.

Development
Urban Chaos: Riot Response was known by three different names in development, it was first called Roll Call, a first-person shooter set in a run-down city in the near future. In October 2005, Eidos announced the project had become Zero Tolerance: City Under Fire for PlayStation 2, Xbox and PC, a first-person shooter following a member of an elite anti-gang unit who must defend a city under siege. Technopop's former president and owner of its assets, Randel B. Reiss, made a statement in which he held the copyright for the title Zero Tolerance, and also announced that he was working on an updated version of the 1994 Zero Tolerance under the same title which was being developed for the PlayStation Portable; the statement alleged trademark infringement on Reiss' trademark and sent a "cease and desist" notice to Eidos Interactive in using the title Zero Tolerance. Eidos later renamed their game Urban Chaos: Riot Response.

The game was developed using the Havok physics engine for in-game physics effects. ReplicaNet was used to supply the software in the online and LAN multiplayer action. Perforce Software's Source Control Management (SCM) System was used to manage the game's source code, documents, and digital asset development.

Reception

The game received "average" reviews on both platforms according to the review aggregation website Metacritic. In Japan, where the PlayStation 2 version was ported for release as simply  and published by Spike on June 28, 2007, Famitsu gave it a score of one eight, one seven, and two eights for a total of 31 out of 40.

References

External links

2006 video games
Cancelled Windows games
Eidos Interactive games
First-person shooters
Multiplayer and single-player video games
Organized crime video games
PlayStation 2 games
Video games about police officers
Video games using Havok
Xbox games
Video games set in the United States
Rocksteady Studios games
Video games developed in the United Kingdom